Rafael Iruzubieta Fernández is a Spanish academician, lawyer and Indologist. In 2010, the Government of India awarded him with the Padma Shri, India's fourth highest civilian award.

Biography
Rafael Iruzubieta Fernández was born on 13 January 1940 in the Spanish capital of Madrid. He secured his doctoral degree in Law from the Complutense University of Madrid and joined the university as a faculty member. He also taught at the University of Malaga.

Iruzubieta met Professor Vasant Gadre, a professor of Spanish language, at the Jawaharlal Nehru University, Delhi, in 1969 and developed a fascination for Indology. He has since founded the Institute of Indology, a nonprofit organization for cultural exchanges between Spain and India. The institute conducts bi-annual courses on India studies at the Complutense University of Madrid. He has also instituted two student awards at JNU, Rafael Iruzubieta Award and Irene Peláez de Iruzubieta Award, for excellence in Spanish studies.

Rafael Iruzubieta has published many books, two of the notables ones are:

References

1940 births
Living people
Recipients of the Padma Shri in public affairs
People from Madrid
Indologists
Complutense University of Madrid alumni
Academic staff of the Complutense University of Madrid
Academic staff of the University of Málaga